The Swiss film industry produced over two hundred feature films in 2014. This article fully lists all non-pornographic films, including short films, that had a release date in that year and which were at least partly made by Switzerland. It does not include films first released in previous years that had release dates in 2014.

Major releases

Minor releases

Notable deaths

See also
 2014 in film
 2014 in Switzerland
 Cinema of Switzerland
 List of Swiss submissions for the Academy Award for Best Foreign Language Film

References

External links

Swiss
Films
2014